Isi Naisarani (born 14 February 1995) is a professional rugby union player who represents  in international rugby and currently plays Super Rugby for the Rebels after previously being with the Brumbies and Western Force.  His usual position is No. 8. Born in Fiji, he qualifies for Australia by residency.

Siblings He has a younger brother named Api.

Super Rugby statistics

References

External links
 

1995 births
Living people
Australia international rugby union players
Fijian rugby union players
Brisbane City (rugby union) players
Rugby union flankers
Sportspeople from Suva
People educated at Ratu Kadavulevu School
Expatriate rugby union players in Australia
Fijian expatriate rugby union players
Fijian emigrants to Australia
Melbourne Rebels players
Western Force players
ACT Brumbies players
Perth Spirit players
Melbourne Rising players
Rugby union number eights
Australian rugby union players
Shizuoka Blue Revs players